Novyye Usy (Yañı Uśı) is a rural locality (a village) in Novoursayevsky Selsoviet, Bakalinsky District, Bashkortostan, Russia. The population was 8 as of 2010. There is 1 street.

Geography 
Novyye Usy is located 36 km southwest of Bakaly (the district's administrative centre) by road. Muslyuminka is the nearest rural locality.

References 

Rural localities in Bakalinsky District